Calosima dianella, the eastern pine catkin borer, is a moth in the family Blastobasidae. It is found in the United States, including Florida, Georgia, South Carolina and Tennessee.

The larvae feed on the catkins of Pinus elliottii.

References

Moths described in 1910
dianella